This is a list of all cricketers who have played first-class, List A or Twenty20 cricket for the Trinidad and Tobago national cricket team in the West Indies. Seasons given are first and last seasons; the player did not necessarily play in all the intervening seasons.

A

 Ellis Achong, 1929/30–1934/35
 Edward Acton, 1900/01–1904/05
 Allman Agard, 1934/35–1937/38
 Joseph Agostini, 1891/92–1896/97
 Edgar Agostini, 1875/76–1895/96
 Andy Aleong, 1960/61–1963/64
 Eddie Aleong, 1953/54–1965/66
 Nicholas Alexis, 2016/17
 Imtiaz Ali, 1993/94
 Imtiaz Ali, 1972/73–1979/80
 Inshan Ali, 1966/67–1979/80
 Jamiel Ali, 1962/63–1966/67
 Syed Ali, 1936/37–1942
 Zaheer Ali, 2000/01–2002/03
 Atiba Allert, 2008/09–2011/12
 Eugene Antoine, 1990/91–1996/97
 Giles Antoine, 1982/83–1985/86
 Alfred Arrowsmith, 1907/08
 Gregory Asgarali, 1968/69–1971/72
 Nyron Asgarali, 1940/41–1959/60
 Ivan Ashtine, 1943/44
 Denis Atkinson, 1947/48–1949/50
 C Attale, 1894/95–1896/97
 David Audain, 1977/78–1981/82
 Jonathan Augustus, 2004/05–2013/14

B

 Kent Babb, 1954/55–1960/61
 Shazam Babwah, 2002/03–2006
 Rishi Bachan, 2004/05–2008/09
 Samuel Badree, 2001/02–2013/14
 DC Bailey, 1910/11
 Kenrick Bainey, 1974/75–1984/85
 Lennox Balgobin, 1969/70
 Anil Balliram, 1993/94–1999/2000
 Desmond Baptiste, 1969/70–1977/78
 Adrian Barath, 2006/07–2013/14
 Marlon Barclay, 2011/12–2012/13
 Prince Bartholomew, 1968/69–1976/77
 Amarnath Basdeo, 1996/97–1997/98
 Rodney Belgrave, 1908/09
 Oliver Bennett, 1907/08–1910/11
 Berrington, 1876/77
 Mario Belcon, 2006–2007/08
 Nelson Betancourt, 1905–1929/30
 Narine Bidhesi, 1989/90–1992/93
 Lionel Birkett, 1929/30–1938/39
 Ian Bishop, 1986/87–1999/2000
 Renwick Bishop, 1986/87–1996/97
 Marlon Black, 1993/94–2003/04
 Mahadeo Bodoe, 1984/85–1996/97
 Ronald Boyack, 1924/25
 JW Branch, 1900/01–1901/02
 Dwayne Bravo, 2001/02–2018/19
 Darren Bravo, 2006/07–2019/20
 T Brereton, 1868/69
 L Brooker, 1901/02
 Darryl Brown, 1999/2000–2002/03
 G Brown, 1897/98
 Patrick Burke, 1941/42
 Harold Burnett, 1942–1946/47
 Alec Burns, 1978/79–1980/81
 George Bushe, 1875/76–1882/83
 Lennox Butler, 1948/49–1955/56

C

 Selwyn Caesar, 1959/60–1963/64
 Joey Carew, 1953/54–1973/74
 Michael Carew, 1988/89–1993/94
 Yannic Cariah, 2010–2019/20
 D Casey, 1893/94–1897/98
 F Castillo, 1909/10
 Teshwan Castro, 2011/12–2012/13
 Hugh Cezair, 1934/35
 Navin Chan, 1999/2000–2002/03
 Bryan Charles, 2014/15–2019/20
 Selwyn Charles, 1959/60
 Lionel Christiani, 1929/30
 Andre Cipriani, 1908/09–1926/27
 A Cipriani, 1868/69
 Mikey Cipriani, 1911/12–1912/13
 R Cipriani, 1899/1900
 Andrew Clarke, 1966/67–1967/68
 Bro Collins, 1882/83–1891/92
 Fish Collins, 1882/83–1895/96
 Elias Constantine, 1931/32–1948/49
 Learie Constantine, 1921/22–1934/35
 Lebrun Constantine, 1893/94–1922/23
 Akiel Cooper, 2010–2017/18
 Cephas Cooper, 2019/20
 Kevon Cooper, 2008/09–2014/15
 Kenneth Corbie, 1951/52–1953/54
 Osmond Corbie, 1957/58–1961/62
 Alvin Corneal, 1959/60–1970/71
 Sheldon Cottrell, 2016/17–2017/18
 Percy Cox, 1901/02–1905
 John Crawford, 1912/13–1923/24
 Daron Cruickshank, 2008/09–2013/14
 Theo Cuffy, 1975/76–1982/83
 Archie Cumberbatch, 1896/97–1905
 C. P. Cumberbatch, 1909/10–1921/22

D

 Lionel D'Ade, 1895/96–1905
 CE Damian, 1893/94
 Alston Daniel, 1980/81–1982/83
 Joshua Da Silva, 2018/19–2019/20
 Bryan Davis, 1959/60–1970/71
 Charlie Davis, 1960/61–1972/73
 Derone Davis, 2014/15
 Gregory Davis, 1990/91
 Wilfred Debissette, 1982/83–1984/85
 Arnot de Boissiere, 1895/96
 V de Boissiere, 1897/98
 Edgar de Gannes, 1891/92–1893/94
 Ferdinand de Gannes, 1909/10–1922/23
 Horace Deighton, 1867/68–1868/69
 Oliver Demming, 1951/52–1953/54
 D de Montbrun, 1893/94
 Narsingh Deonarine, 2015/16
 Richard de Souza, 1964/65–1972/73
 George Dewhurst, 1919/20–1929/30
 Deonarine Deyal, 1986/87
 Mark Deyal, 2014/15
 Rajindra Dhanraj, 1987/88–2000/01
 Anthony Dharson, 1983/84
 Keith D'Heurieux, 1972/73–1982/83
 Mervyn Dillon, 1996/97–2007/08
 Bridget Durity, 1973/74
 Oscar Durity, 1969/70–1972/73
 Ananda Dwarika, 1986/87–1988/89

E

 William Eccles, 1868/69
 J Eckstein, 1899/1900
 Bruce Eligon, 1965/66
 Donald Eligon, 1933/34–1936/37
 Russel Elvin, 1991/92–1993/94
 Rayad Emrit, 2003/04–2018/19

F

 Ronald Faria 1967/68–1978/79
 Philo Ferguson, 1959/60
 Wilfred Ferguson, 1942/43–1955/56
 H Fitt, 1905
 Thomas Fitzherbert, 1903/04
 Delbert Fitzpatrick, 1943/44–1951/52
 M Forde, 1951/52
 Nigel Francis, 1992/93–1997/98
 Cyril Fraser, 1922/23–1928/29
 George Fung, 1936/37
 Carl Furlonge, 1952/53–1960/61
 David Furlonge, 1981/82–1984/85
 Hammond Furlonge, 1954/55–1961/62
 Kenneth Furlonge, 1957/58–1966/67

G

 Richard Gabriel, 1968/69–1985/86
 Shannon Gabriel, 2009/10–2018/19
 P Gajadhar, 1908/09
 D'Arcy Galt, 1936/37–1947/48
 Edward Gammon, 1909/10
 Daren Ganga, 1996/97–2012/13
 Sherwin Ganga, 2003/04–2013/14
 Hermat Gangapersad, 1986/87–1992/93
 Andy Ganteaume, 1940/41–1962/63
 GL Garcia, 1868/69–1875/76
 Garnet Gilman, 1985/86–1987/88
 Connell Gittens, 1896/97–1897/98
 Randolph Glasgow, 1984/85
 Gerry Gomez, 1936/37–1955/56
 Larry Gomes, 1971/72–1987/88
 Sheldon Gomes, 1968/69–1982/83
 Egerton Gomez, 1911/12
 Gregory Gomez, 1977/78
 Nicholas Gomez, 1985/86
 MG Gooding, 1891/92
 Jyd Goolie, 2016/17–2019/20
 Sanjiv Gooljar, 2005/06–2006/07
 Danraj Gopiesingh, 1977/78
 F Gransaull, 1905
 Fred Grant, 1923/24–1926/27
 George Grant, 1875/76–1876/77
 Jackie Grant, 1933/34–1934/35
 Rolph Grant, 1933/34–1938/39
 Tony Gray, 1983/84–1995/96
 John Green, 1935/36–1937/38
 Ellis Grell, 1910/11
 Mervyn Grell, 1923/24–1937/38
 Justin Guillen, 2008/09–2015/16
 Noel Guillen, 1951/52–1953/54
 Sammy Guillen, 1947/48–1952
 Victor Guillen, 1921/22
 Subhash Gupte, 1963/64

H

 Wes Hall, 1966/67–1969/70
 Abdul Hamid, 1922/23–1923/24
 Leonard Harbin, 1935/36–1940/41
 Albert Harding, 1945/46–1952
 N Hargreaves, 1907/08
 Bertie Harragin, 1896/97–1931/32
 Norton Hart, 1905–1910/11
 W Haynes, 1898/99
 Kenneth Hazel, 1993/94–2000/01
 Moses Hector, 1904/05–1910/11
 A Hendrickson, 1891/92
 Joseph Hendrickson, 1937/38–1940/41
 Randolph Hezekiah, 1955/56
 Terrance Hinds, 2019/20
 William Hoad, 1903/04–1905/06
 Hobson, 1891/92
 David Holford, 1962/63
 Kyle Hope, 2015/16–2019/20
 Akeal Hosein, 2012/13–2019/20
 Errol Hunte, 1928/29–1933/34
 Roland Hutcheon, 1941/42
 H Hutton, 1893/94–1897/98

J

 GRA Jack, 1893/94
 Andy Jackson, 2000/01–2003/04
 Sydney Jagbir, 1934/35–1952
 Amit Jaggernauth, 2003/04–2013/14
 Jon-Russ Jaggesar, 2015/16–2019/20
 Ricky Jaipaul, 2013/14–2017/18
 Denzil James, 2001/02
 Asif Jan, 1999/2000–2001/02
 Imran Jan, 1999/2000–2004/05
 Amir Jangoo, 2016/17–2018/19
 George John, 1909/10–1925/26
 Leo John, 1963/64–1968/69
 Tyrell Johnson, 1935/36–1938/39
 WM Johnson, 1908/09–1910/11
 Prior Jones, 1936/37–1950/51
 Harold Joseph, 1980/81–1987/88
 J Joseph, 1912/13
 Bernard Julien, 1968/69–1981/82
 Ashmead Jumadeen, 1991/92
 Jerry Jumadeen, 1999/2000
 Raphick Jumadeen, 1970/71–1980/81
 Shamshuddin Jumadeen, 1981/82–1982/83

K

 Aneil Kanhai, 2001/02–2011/12
 Ben Kanhai, 1952/53–1953/54
 Rohan Kanhai, 1964/65
 Kavesh Kantasingh, 2010–2015/16
 Steven Katwaroo, 2011/12–2019/20
 Richard Kelly, 2004/05–2011
 Joseph Kelshall, 1911/12–1919/20
 Imran Khan, 2004/05–2019/20
 Frank King, 1950/51
 AB Knox, 1867/68–1868/69
 Davindra Krishna, 2003/04

L

 A Lamy, 1882/83
 Brian Lara, 1987/88–2007/08
 Oliver Lashley, 1943/44
 O Latour, 1903/04
 Andre Lawrence, 1993/94–1998/99
 George Learmond, 1900/01–1910/11
 Ralph Legall, 1946/47–1957/58
 Mandilhon Leotaud, 1891/92–1894/95
 Anthony Lewis, 1969/70–1971/72
 Evin Lewis, 2011/12–2018/19
 Gerald Liddlelow, 1923/24–1928/29
 Gus Logie, 1978/79–1991/92
 Alfred Low, 1896/97–1900/01
 Joseph Lucas, 1898/99–1903/04
 Kyron Lynch, 2004/05
 Randall Lyon, 1975/76–1982/83

M

 Ralph McGregor, 1931/32–1933/34
 C McLean, 1882/83–1887/88
 Andrew McLeod, 1978/79–1980/81
 Bernard McLeod, 1974/75–1977/78
 Donald McLeod, 1986/87–1989/90
 Arthur Maingot, 1910/11–1919/20
 Kissoondath Magram, 2019/20
 Gregory Mahabir, 2000/01–2005/06
 Ganesh Mahabir, 1982/83–1987/88
 Robert Mahabir, 1988/89–1994/95
 Surujdath Mahabir, 1993/94
 Rajkumar Mahadeo, 1991/92
 R Maingot, 1919/20
 Vivian Maingot, 1919/20–1923/24
 Rajindra Mangallie, 1992/93–1994/95
 Tishan Maraj, 2003/04–2010/11
 Ruskin Mark, 1976/77
 Edgar Marsden, 1948/49
 Norman Marshall, 1953/54–1954/55
 Victor Marshall, 1954/55
 Keno Mason, 1992/93–2001/02
 Hugo Massey, 1891/92–1895/96
 Leopold Matthieu, 1875/76–1882/83
 JW Mayers, 1898/99
 Arthur Maynard, 1934/35
 Cyril Merry, 1929/30–1938/39
 David Merry, 1940/41
 Kenneth Miller, 1981/82
 Marcus Minshall, 1959/60–1961/62
 Theodore Modeste, 2000/01–2006/07
 Dave Mohammed, 2000/01–2012/13
 David Mohammed, 1984/85–1990/91
 Gibran Mohammed, 2003/04–2011/12
 Jason Mohammed, 2005/06–2019/20
 Noor Mohammed, 1977/78
 Lewis Moorsom, 1868/69
 Prakash Moosai, 1981/82–1985/86
 Reynold Morgan, 1973/74
 Runako Morton, 2010/11
 Uthman Muhammad, 2015/16–2019/20
 Colin Murray, 1973/74–1980/81
 Deryck Murray, 1960/61–1980/81
 Lance Murray, 1956/57

N

 Magnum Nanan, 2007/08–2008/09
 Rangy Nanan, 1972/73–1990/91
 Sunil Narine, 2008/09–2018/19
 Samad Niamat, 1940/41
 Ewart Nicholson, 2015/16–2017/18
 William Nock, 1891/92
 Jack Noreiga, 1961/62–1971/72

O

 Arnold Oliver, 1975/76
 Sylvester Oliver, 1954/55–1957/58
 Charles Ollivierre, 1894/95
 Helon Ollivierre, 1903/04
 Mike Olton, 1959/60
 Kjorn Ottley, 2012/13–2016/17
 Yannick Ottley, 2012–2019/20
 Ronald Outridge, 1956/57

P

 Charles Packer, 1899/1900–1901/02
 Hollister Pajotte, 2000/01
 Victor Pascall, 1905/06–1926/27
 Arthur Paul, 1963/64–1965/66
 EG Penalosa, 1868/69–1893/94
 J Pereira, 1895/96–1897/98
 William Perkins, 2006–2012/13
 Chatterpaul Persaud, 1940/41
 Mukesh Persad, 1994/95–2002/03
 Vishal Persad-Maharaj, 1998/99
 Edward Peter, 1936/37
 Buxton Peters, 1955/56–1959/60
 Anderson Phillip, 2016/17–2019/20
 Claude Phillip, 1972/73–1974/75
 Khary Pierre, 2012–2019/20
 Lance Pierre, 1940/41–1949/50
 C Piggott, 1912/13–1923/24
 JA Pinder, 1898/99–1907/08
 D Plummer, 1895/96–1897/98
 Ernest Plummer, 1895/96–1896/97
 ET Pocock, 1882/83
 HM Pollard, 1893/94–1901/02
 Kieron Pollard, 2006–2018/19
 Ponsonby, 1876/77
 Nicholas Pooran, 2012/13–2018/19
 Cecil Pouchet, 1937/38–1948/49
 Ricardo Powell, 2003/04–2006
 E Power, 1867/68–1875/76
 Roshon Primus, 2016/17–2017/18

R

 Narine Ragoo, 1962/63–1978/79
 Suruj Ragoonath, 1988/89–2000/01
 Adron Rahim, 1990/91
 Aneil Rajah, 1979/80–1987/88
 Emile Rajah, 2011/12
 Isaiah Rajah, 2016/17–2019/20
 Sonny Ramadhin, 1949/50–1952/53
 Rudolph Ramatali, 1956/57
 Donald Ramsamooj, 1952–1956/57
 Denesh Ramdin, 2004/05–2019/20
 Nicholas Ramjass, 2006
 Dudnath Ramkissoon, 1969/70–1977/78
 Dinanath Ramnarine, 1993/94–2003/04
 Premnath Ramnath, 1981/82–1982/83
 Harry Ramoutar, 1964/65–1969/70
 Ravi Rampaul, 2001/02–2018/19
 Ramkaran Ramperass, 1981/82–1982/83
 Capil Rampersad, 1983/84–1987/88
 Denis Rampersad, 1996/97–2000/01
 Abdul Razack, 1923/24
 Kurban Razack, 1934/35
 AC Reece, 1905
 Denzil Regis, 1980/81
 Arden Reid, 1955/56
 JL Ritchie, 1926/27
 Marlon Richards, 2012/13–2017/18
 Mervyn Richardson, 1985/86
 Clifford Roach, 1923/24–1937/38
 Alphonso Roberts, 1956/57
 Kenneth Roberts, 1957/58–1965/66
 Lincoln Roberts, 1995/96–2002/03
 Pascall Roberts, 1960/61–1973/74
 Noel Robinson, 1961/62
 Walter Robinson, 1882/83–1887/88
 Willie Rodriguez, 1953/54–1969/70
 Joseph Rogers, 1908/09–1921/22
 JA Romeo, 1901/02–1905
 Leon Romero, 1998/99–2000/01
 Stephen Rudder, 1896/97
 Earnil Ryan, 2003/04

S

 Vernon Sadahpal, 1969/70
 Balkaram Sagram, 1976/77–1977/78
 Gopaul Sahadeo, 1979/80–1983/84
 Daniel St Clair, 2014/15–2019/20
 Dean St Hilaire, 1983/84–1988/89
 Cyl St Hill, 1928/29
 Edwin St Hill, 1923/24–1929/30
 Wilton St Hill, 1911/12–1929/30
 Avidesh Samaroo, 1995/96–1999/2000
 Sookval Samaroo, 1940/41–1942/43
 Chiki Sampath, 1948/49–1953/54
 Roland Sampath, 1980/81–1983/84
 William Sarel, 1904/05–1905/06
 Noble Sarkar, 1942
 J Saturnin, 1893/94
 EG Scott, 1893/94
 Ben Sealey, 1923/24–1940/41
 Derek Sealy, 1935/36–1948/49
 EP Serrett, 1887/88–1893/94
 William Shepherd, 1896/97
 Richard Sieuchan, 1986/87–1990/91
 Keagan Simmons, 2019/20
 Lendl Simmons, 2001/02–2018/19
 Phil Simmons, 1982/83–2000/01
 Charran Singh, 1959/60–1961/62
 Robin Singh, 1982/83–1983/84
 Clarence Skeete, 1941/42–1952
 Nigel Slinger, 1959/60
 Joe Small, 1909/10–1931/32
 Wayne Smart, 1967/68
 CR Smith, 1898/99–1909/10
 H Smith, 1901/02
 M Smith, 1891/92–1898/99
 Odean Smith, 2018/19–2019/20
 Richard Smith, 1990/91–2002/03
 Sydney Smith, 1899/1900–1905/06
 Jeremy Solozano, 2012/13–2019/20
 Nicholas Sookdeosingh, 2014/15
 Rodney Sooklal, 1999/2000–2005/06
 Ethelred Sorzano, 1975/76–1978/79
 Charles Spooner, 1937/38
 Navin Stewart, 2008/09–2013/14
 Jeff Stollmeyer, 1937/38–1956/57
 Vic Stollmeyer, 1935/36–1945/46
 David Sultan, 1991/92–1992/93
 John Suraj, 1983/84

T

 A Taitt, 1894/95–1895/96
 Rupert Tang Choon, 1934/35–1954/55
 Jaswick Taylor, 1953/54–1959/60
 Kenton Thompson, 2003/04
 FW Thorburn, 1901/02
 Arthur Trestrail, 1937/38–1946/47
 Kenneth Trestrail, 1943/44–1949/50
 EA Turpin, 1907/08–1909/10

U
 JO Urich, 1897/98–1901/02

W

 AV Waddell, 1921/22–1925/26
 Osmond Wallace, 1903/04
 William Waller, 1942–1942/43
 FT Warburton, 1868/69
 Broderick Warner, 1876/77
 Charles Warner, 1867/68–1868/69
 Henry Warner, 1876/77
 Aucher Warner, 1886/87–1901/02
 Thornton Warner, 1876/77–1894/95
 Tion Webster, 2016/17–2019/20
 Eugène Wehekind, 1875/76–1882/83
 Peter Whiteman, 1968/69
 Archie Wiles, 1919/20–1935/36
 David Williams, 1982/83–1998/99
 Kenneth Williams, 1983/84–1993/94
 Kelvin Williams, 1981/82–1989/90
 Philton Williams, 2015/16
 C Wilson, 1894/95
 J Wilson, 1904/05–1905
 Float Woods, 1893/94–1900/01

Y
 W Yeates, 1922/23–1931/32
 Clint Yorke, 1986/87–1992/93

Notes

References

Cricket in Trinidad and Tobago
Trinidad